Peteet Creek is a stream in Grundy and Mercer Counties in the U.S. state of Missouri. It is a tributary of the Thompson River.

Peteet Creek most likely was named after the local Peteet family.

See also
List of rivers of Missouri

References

Rivers of Grundy County, Missouri
Rivers of Mercer County, Missouri
Rivers of Missouri